Aleksandr Maksimov and other variations may refer to:

 Oleksandr Maksymov (born 1985), Ukrainian footballer
 Aleksandr Maksimov (ethnographer) (1872–1941), Soviet ethnographer
 Alexander A. Maximow (1874–1928), Russian-American histologist
 Alexander Maximov (politician) (born 1946), Russian politician